David Ickringill (1930–2012), was a male wrestler who competed for England.

Wrestling career
He represented England in the -68 kg division at the 1950 British Empire Games in Auckland, New Zealand. Eight years later he represented England in the -74 kg division at the 1958 British Empire and Commonwealth Games in Cardiff, Wales.

Personal life
During the Games in 1950 he lived at Well Street, Keighley and was a decorator by trade.

References

1930 births
2012 deaths
English male wrestlers
Wrestlers at the 1950 British Empire Games
Wrestlers at the 1958 British Empire and Commonwealth Games
Commonwealth Games competitors for England